The men's 100 metres event at the 2000 Asian Athletics Championships was held in Jakarta, Indonesia on 28–30 August.

Medalists

Results

Heats
Wind:Heat 1: -1.7 m/s, Heat 2: -1.8 m/s, Heat 3: -1.8 m/s, Heat 4: -2.1 m/s, Heat 5: -1.5 m/s

Semifinals
Wind:Heat 1: -1.1 m/s, Heat 2: -0.3 m/s

Final
Wind: +0.2 m/s

References

2000 Asian Athletics Championships
100 metres at the Asian Athletics Championships